Oxytoxum elegans is  a species of dinoflagellates in the order Peridiniales. It is found in the Gulf of Mexico, the Lebanese Exclusive Economic Zone waters and the North Atlantic Ocean.

References 

 Gómez, F. (2005). A list of free-living dinoflagellate species in the world's oceans. Acta Bot. Croat. 64(1): 129-212.

Dinophyceae
Protists described in 1916